Ghassan Raouf Heamed (born 18 December 1971) is an Iraqi football manager and former player who manages Assyriska.

Career

Playing career

Heamed started his career with Romanian side Sportul Studențesc. In 1995, he signed for Assyriska in the Swedish second tier, helping them earn promotion to the Swedish top flight. In 2005, Heamed signed for Tunisian club Club Africain.

Managerial career

In 2021, he was appointed manager of Assyriska in Sweden.

References

External links
 

1971 births
Allsvenskan players
Association football defenders
Assyriska FF players
Club Africain players
Ettan Fotboll players
Expatriate footballers in Romania
Expatriate footballers in Sweden
Expatriate footballers in Tunisia
FC Sportul Studențesc București players
Iraq international footballers
Iraqi football managers
Iraqi expatriate footballers
Iraqi expatriate sportspeople in Romania
Iraqi expatriate sportspeople in Sweden
Iraqi footballers
Living people
Superettan players